The hermit thrush is a bird native to North America. Hermit Thrush may also refer to:

Hermit Thrush (band), an American folk band active in the mid 1990s whose members later formed the band Dispatch
Thrush Hermit, a Canadian alternative rock band active in the 1990s